BBC Knowledge Magazine was a magazine covering science, nature and history which was launched in 2008; it closed in November 2012. The magazine's now-defunct website described it thus:
BBC Knowledge Magazine - the new magazine about science, nature and history...invention, innovation and more. Sir Francis Bacon was right about knowledge. It is power. Ben Franklin agreed, "An investment in knowledge always pays the best interest."

BBC Knowledge Magazine is unrelated to the TV channels BBC Knowledge and BBC Knowledge (international)

The magazine was chosen as one of the top ten magazines launched in 2008 by Library Journal.

BBC Knowledge Magazine reprinted articles from BBC Focus, BBC History and BBC Wildlife.

References

2008 establishments in the United Kingdom
2012 disestablishments in the United Kingdom
BBC publications
Bi-monthly magazines published in the United Kingdom
Defunct magazines published in the United Kingdom
Magazines established in 2008
Magazines disestablished in 2012
Science and technology magazines published in the United Kingdom